Season 1890–91 was the 14th season in which Hibernian competed at a Scottish national level, entering the Scottish Cup for the 14th time.

Overview 

Hibs reached the second round of the Scottish Cup, losing 9–1 to Dumbarton.

Results 

All results are written with Hibs' score first.

Scottish Cup

Edinburgh International Exhibition Cup

See also
List of Hibernian F.C. seasons

Notes

External links 
 Results For Season 1890/1891 in All Competitions, www.ihibs.co.uk

Hibernian F.C. seasons
Hibernian